Yunzhongzi is a character from the famed classic Chinese novel Fengshen Yanyi. 

Yunzhongzi is a renowned immortal of the Jade Column Cave atop Mount South End. After the sinister Daji had taken her grasp over King Zhou of Shang, Yunzhongzi was the first immortal to see the injustice from above the clouds. After Yunzhongzi realized that this was none other than the Thousand-Year Vixen, he exclaimed the words "If she is not eliminated, great disaster will befall the Red Dust! I must prevent this from happening!" Following this event, Yunzhongzi presented himself before King Zhou. After the king had asked for Yunzhongzi's home, Yunzhongzi responded by saying that he is from water--heart of cloud, mind of fluidity. Thus following this point, Yunzhongzi would engage in a great reformative conversation with the king in the hopes that he would be rid of Daji and employ the Taoist way to his kingdom. Before Yunzhongzi left the king, he handed him his wooden sword, a sword that would gradually kill Daji through its latent spiritual power instilled by Yunzhongzi. 

5 chapters later during chapter 10, Yunzhongzi would be seen once again before the Grand Duke of the West, Ji Chang. After a special child had been found in a mysterious tomb following a very rare and sudden lightning storm, Yunzhongzi would once again appear. When Yunzhongzi had held the small baby in his arms after receiving consent, he said the words "My Grand Duke. Please let me take this child to Mount South End, to raise and educate. When you come back in seven years, I will return him to you." Thus holding the baby in his hands, he parts the clouds and returns to the skies, determined to instill the Taoist ways into this future savior of the new dynasty. 

Later on within chapter 22, Yunzhongzi peered over his Mount South End and saw Ji Chang being chased by Generals Yin and Lei of Zhaoge. Once Yunzhongzi unleashed Leizhenzi to save Ji Chang, he would not reappear again for some time.

See also
Jiu Ge

References
 Investiture of the Gods - chapter 5
 Investiture of the Gods - chapter 10

Investiture of the Gods characters
Taoist immortals